Zastavna is a town in Chernivtsi Raion, Chernivtsi Oblast of Ukraine. It hosts the administration of Zastavna urban hromada, one of the hromadas of Ukraine. Population:

History

The first mention in chronicles is dated to 1589. 
The name of Zastavna most likely origins from its location surrounded by ponds (ukr. "stav"). There is also a version that the name goes from the turnpike (ukr. "zastava") on the road to Chernivtsi existed in old times.

Zastavna has status of town since 1940. Between 1941-1944, it was known as Târgu Nistrului.

A local newspaper is published here since January 1945.

In January 1989 the population was 9438 people.

In January 2013 the population was 8063 people.

Until 18 July 2020, Zastavna served as an administrative center of Zastavna Raion. The raion was abolished in July 2020 as part of the administrative reform of Ukraine, which reduced the number of raions of Chernivtsi Oblast to three. The area of Zastavna Raion was merged into Chernivtsi Raion.

Transport 
 a railway station (Lviv Railways)

References

External links
 Zastavna on the web-site of the Verkhovna Rada of Ukraine (official website)

Gallery

Cities in Chernivtsi Oblast
Bukovina
Cities of district significance in Ukraine
Duchy of Bukovina